Raleigh Roundtree (born August 31, 1975) is a former American football offensive guard in the National Football League who played seven seasons in the NFL from 1997-2003. He played his first five seasons for the San Diego Chargers and his final two for the Arizona Cardinals.

He played a total of 72 career games, including 47 career starts. He was the starting right guard in San Diego in 2000 and 2001.

External links
NFL.com player page

1975 births
Living people
American football offensive guards
Arizona Cardinals players
Edmonton Elks players
Players of American football from Augusta, Georgia
San Diego Chargers players
South Carolina State University alumni
Ed Block Courage Award recipients